Khilek is a tambon (sub-district) of Mae Taeng District, in Chiang Mai Province, Thailand. In 2014 it had a population of 9,334 people.

Administration

Central administration
The tambon is divided into 11 administrative villages (muban).

Local administration
The area of the sub-district is shared by two local governments.
the sub-district municipality (thesaban tambon) San Maha Phon (เทศบาลตำบลสันมหาพน)
the sub-district municipality Chom Chaeng (เทศบาลตำบลจอมแจ้ง)

References

Tambon of Chiang Mai province
Populated places in Chiang Mai province